Ngonidzashe Ncube (born 12 July 1986) is a Zimbabwean long-distance runner who specialises in the marathon. He represented Zimbabwe at the 2019 World Athletics Championships, competing in men's marathon.

References

1986 births
Living people
Zimbabwean male long-distance runners
Zimbabwean male marathon runners
World Athletics Championships athletes for Zimbabwe